Wolfeboro I is a 1966 abstract painting by Frank Stella. It is currently in the collection of the San Francisco Museum of Modern Art.

References

1966 paintings
Paintings by Frank Stella
Paintings in the collection of the San Francisco Museum of Modern Art